Duke Xian of Qin (725–704 BC) was from 715 to 704 BC the eighth ruler of the Zhou Dynasty Chinese state of Qin that eventually united China to become the Qin Dynasty.  His ancestral name was Ying (嬴), and Duke Xian was his posthumous title.  His title was recorded as Duke Ning of Qin (秦寧公) in the Records of the Grand Historian by Han Dynasty historian Sima Qian, but inscriptions on excavated bronzes from the era have proven that "Ning" (寧) was a miscopy of the correct character "Xian" (憲).

Accession to the throne
Duke Xian succeeded his grandfather Duke Wen of Qin, who ruled for 50 years and died in 716 BC.  Duke Xian was made the crown prince after his father predeceased Duke Wen in 718 BC.  His father was given the posthumous title Duke Jing of Qin (秦竫公) although he never ascended the throne.

Reign
In 714 BC, the second year of Duke Xian's reign, the Qin capital was moved to Pingyang (平陽, in present-day Baoji, Shaanxi).  The next year Qin defeated the Rong state of Bo (亳), whose king escaped to the Rong homeland.

In autumn 708 BC Qin attacked the minor state of Rui, but was defeated.  Qin returned in winter with the army of King Huan of Zhou, defeated Rui, and captured Wan, Count of Rui.

Succession
In 704 BC Qin annexed Bo.  Duke Xian died in the same year, aged 21.  He had three young sons: the eldest, later known as Duke Wu of Qin, was the crown prince.  The second son, later known as Duke De of Qin, was born to the same mother, Lu Ji (鲁姬).  However, the ministers Fuji and Sanfu deposed the crown prince and installed the youngest son, by Duke Xian's other wife Wang Ji (王姬), on the throne.  The boy was only five years old and would become known as Chuzi.

References 

Rulers of Qin
8th-century BC Chinese monarchs
725 BC births
704 BC deaths